Wessex was a European Parliament constituency covering all of Dorset in England, plus parts of western Hampshire and southern Wiltshire. It was named after the Anglo-Saxon Kingdom of Wessex.

Prior to its uniform adoption of proportional representation in 1999, the United Kingdom used first-past-the-post for the European elections in England, Scotland and Wales. The European Parliament constituencies used under that system were smaller than the later regional constituencies and only had one Member of the European Parliament each.

The constituency consisted of the Westminster Parliament constituencies of Bournemouth East, Bournemouth West, Christchurch and Lymington, North Dorset, Poole, South Dorset, Westbury and West Dorset.

The constituency was replaced by much of Dorset East and Hampshire West and parts of Somerset and Dorset West and Wiltshire in 1984.  Following further changes, these seats became part of the much larger South West England and South East England constituencies in 1999.

Members of the European Parliament

Results

References

External links
 David Boothroyd's United Kingdom Election Results

European Parliament constituencies in England (1979–1999)
Politics of Dorset
Politics of Hampshire
Politics of Wiltshire
Wessex
1979 establishments in England
1984 disestablishments in England
Constituencies established in 1979
Constituencies disestablished in 1984